Celle is a district (Landkreis) in Lower Saxony, Germany. It is bounded by (from the north and clockwise) the districts of Uelzen, Gifhorn, Hanover and Heidekreis.

Geography 
The district is located in the southernmost parts of the Lüneburg Heath (Lüneburger Heide). The Aller River enters the district in the east, runs through the town of Celle and leaves the district in the northwest. It is joined by many tributaries coming from the south.

Lüneburg Regional Association 
To look after cultural matters the Lüneburg Regional Association (Lüneburgischer Landschaftsverband) was founded as a registered association (eingetragener Verein).

Coat of arms 

The lion and the heart were part of the arms of the Lüneburg, a subdivision of the Duchy of Brunswick-Lüneburg. The Principality was occasionally (but incorrectly) also known as Brunswick-Celle, since Celle was its capital for some time. The only difference is the number of hearts (the original coat of arms included more than one heart).

Towns and municipalities

Miscellaneous 
 The town of Bergen is known for its southern quarter of Belsen, where the Nazi concentration camp of Bergen-Belsen was.
 The village of Eschede north of Celle was the site of the Eschede train disaster on June 3, 1998, when an ICE high-speed train derailed and 101 people died.

See also
Metropolitan region Hannover-Braunschweig-Göttingen-Wolfsburg

References

External links 

  

 
Districts of Lower Saxony